Ruth-Pauline Partridge (née Smeeth; born 19 June 1960) is a female retired English long-distance runner.

Athletics career
She finished 19th at the 1980 World Cross Country Championships, also winning a silver medal in the team competition. She finished 24th at the 1982 World Cross Country Championships, also winning a bronze medal in the team competition. She finished 15th at the 1984 World Cross Country Championships, also winning a silver medal in the team competition. She finished 20th at the 1986 World Cross Country Championships, also winning a gold medal in the team competition.

She represented England in the 3,000 metres event, at the 1982 Commonwealth Games in Brisbane, Queensland, Australia. and also represented England eight years later, at the 1990 Commonwealth Games in Auckland, New Zealand. At the 1990 Commonwealth Games Partridge finished sixth in the 3000 metres.

Her daughter is Current British Athlete Lily Partridge

References

1960 births
Living people
English female long-distance runners
British female long-distance runners
English female cross country runners
British female cross country runners
Commonwealth Games competitors for England
Athletes (track and field) at the 1982 Commonwealth Games
Athletes (track and field) at the 1990 Commonwealth Games